Bhofal Chambers is a Liberian politician. He is serving as Speaker of the House of Representatives of Liberia since 2018. He is member of the House of Representatives of Liberia from 16 January 2006.

References 

Speakers of the House of Representatives of Liberia
Year of birth missing (living people)
Living people
21st-century Liberian politicians